Francis Hardy may refer to:
 Francis Hardy (Irish politician)
 Francis Hardy (French politician)